The X-Files Season 10 is a 25-issue comic book series published by IDW Publishing. The title serves as a continuation of the television series The X-Files. Chris Carter, who created the television series, is the Executive Producer of the comic book series and also contributed to several elements to the comics' stories. The issues are written by Joe Harris. In addition to the main title, several miniseries and one-shots written by Harris and Karl Kesel, take place during the Season 10 storyline and supplement it. These include The X-Files: Year Zero and The X-Files X-Mas Special 2014.

Background
In early 2013, it was announced that The X-Files would return to comic book form with the subtitle "Season 10". The series debuted in June 2013. Joe Harris wrote the series and Michael Walsh and Jordie Bellaire provided the interior artwork with Matthew Dow Smith taking over Walsh's art duties with Issue 11. The series continued the series' mythology, with the first arc "seek[ing] to bring the mythology of the Alien Conspiracy back up to date in a more paranoid, post-terror, post-WikiLeaks society." Furthermore, sequels to popular Monster-of-the-Week episodes are expected to be made.

Harris first become attached to the project after Chris Ryall of IDW Publishing asked him if he was at all interested in a comic adaptation of the series. Harris, who was an avid fan, was receptive to the idea and "holed up for a couple of days and punched out a take on the material". He then presented his ideas to IDW, who approved of the stories. Harris then had to seek approval from Fox, the owner of the series' rights, and "get them excited about the direction". Harris then met with series' creator Chris Carter, who agreed to be executive producer for the comics. Carter's job would be "providing feedback to the creative team regarding scripts and outlines to keep the new stories in line with existing and on-going canon."

Carlos Valenzuela illustrated the regular covers for the first nine issues, while Francesco Francavilla took over this function starting with issue #10.

Publication

Issues

Hardcover Collected Volumes

Awards and nominations

Season 10 was nominated for two Diamond Gem Awards:  2013 Best New Comic Book Series and 2013 Licensed Comic of the Year (Issue #1).

Jordie Bellaire won the 2014 Eisner Award for Best Coloring based in part for her work on this title.

The X-Files: Year Zero
In addition to the ongoing Season 10 title, IDW also published a monthly 5-issue miniseries called The X-Files: Year Zero beginning on July 16, 2014. Written by Karl Kesel with art by Vic Mahlhotra and Greg Scott, the miniseries fleshed out the origins of The X-Files as first alluded to in the season one television episode "Shapes".

The X-Files X-Mas Special 2014
Published by IDW on December 24, 2014, written by Joe Harris and Karl Kesel, art by Matthew Dow Smith and Matthew Southworth. 
The holidays have brought together all the X-Files agents for the very first time! Walter Skinner hosts a get-together for his most special agents, but the festive night turns tense when someone—or something—comes down the chimney! In a second story, the X-Files team of the 1940s—Bing Ellington and Millie Ohio from the Year Zero miniseries—investigate a potential Communist saboteur, but discover an impossible creature—a gremlin!

Audio drama

The Season 10 comic was adapted into a pair of audio drama mini-series, produced by Dirk Maggs for Audible. It featured the voices of David Duchovny, Gillian Anderson, Mitch Pileggi, William B. Davis, Tom Braidwood, Dean Haglund, and Bruce Harwood. 

"The X-Files: Cold Cases" adapted the stories: Believers (70 min), Hosts (38 min), Being for the Benefit of Mr. X (25 min), More Musings of a Cigarette Smoking Man (23 min), Pilgrims (87 min).

"The X-Files: Stolen Lives" adapted the stories: Immaculate (41 min), Chitter (22 min), Monica & John (21 min), G-23 (40 min), Elders (98 min).

References

2013 comics debuts
Comics based on television series
Science fiction comics
Season 10
Horror comics